Macksville is an unincorporated community in Pendleton County, West Virginia, United States. Macksville is located along U.S. Route 33/West Virginia Route 28 on the North Fork South Branch Potomac River.

The community derives its name from Peter McDonald, an early postmaster.

References

Unincorporated communities in Pendleton County, West Virginia
Unincorporated communities in West Virginia